Clarion Partners ("Clarion") is an American real estate investment firm headquartered in New York City. The firm is the real estate asset management platform of Franklin Templeton Investments.

In 2022, IREI ranked Clarion as the eighth largest real estate investment manager in North America based on assets under management.

Background 
The firm was founded in 1982 by Stephen Furnary and John Weisz who previously worked at Citibank's real estate investment management group. Frank Sullivan who was also from Citibank joined them shortly after it was formed. When it was incorporated, it operated under the name Jones Lang Wootton Realty Advisors (JLWRA) as Jones Lang Wootton was a corporate partner. 

During that period, real estate investment was mostly by large private institutions related to Banks and Insurance companies. The aim of the firm was to allow investors the opportunity to work with smaller and more nimble organizations.

In 1995, the founders bought out Jones Lang's interest in the firm and renamed it to Clarion Partners.

In 1998, ING Group acquired Clarion and the firm's brand name changed to ING Clarion.

In 2011, Lightyear Capital partnered with Clarion's management to acquire Clarion from ING for $100 million.

In 2016, Lightyear Capital sold Clarion to Legg Mason for $585 million.

In 2021, Franklin Templeton Investments acquired Legg Mason for $4.5 billion. As Clarion was a subsidiary under Legg Mason, it has now become a subsidiary under Franklin Templeton Investments. 

On September 11, 2005, Co-founder Weisz passed away. On May 13, 2014, Co-founder Sullivan retired from the firm. On April 17, 2017, the final Co-founder, Furnary retired from the firm but still remained Executive chairman and passed on operational duties to the new CEO, David Gilbert.

Investments 
Most of Clarion's real estate investments are based in North America.

 1201 Third Avenue
 1600 Seventh Avenue
 American Stock Exchange Building
 Burlington Center Mall
 Constitution Center
 Old Palm Golf Club
 West Hollywood Gateway

References

External links
 

1982 establishments in New York City
Financial services companies established in 1982
Companies based in New York City
Investment companies of the United States
Real estate companies of the United States